David Allan Fiore (born August 10, 1974) is a former American football offensive lineman in the National Football League for the San Francisco 49ers and the Washington Redskins.  He played college football at Hofstra University. 

Fiore grew up in Waldwick, New Jersey and played high school football at Waldwick High School.

References

1974 births
Living people
Sportspeople from Hackensack, New Jersey
People from Waldwick, New Jersey
American football offensive linemen
Hofstra Pride football players
San Francisco 49ers players
Washington Redskins players